Algı Eke (born 16 September 1985) is a Turkish actress.

She was born on 16 September 1985 in Istanbul. Her family are originally from Artvin and of Georgian descent. Her parents divorced when she was a child. Her mother died in the summer of 2013. After graduating from Cağaloğlu Anadolu Lisesi, Eke went to Berlin to continue her studies in dramaturgy. Upon her return to Turkey, she met the producer Mustafa Şevki Doğan and made her television debut with the series Baba Ocağı. She later played in the series Dürüye'nin Güğümleri, Keşanlı Ali Destanı and Annem Uyurken. Eke also appeared in Pinhani's music video for their song "Yitirmeden". She portrayed the character of Kıymet in the romantic comedy movie Kedi Özledi, opposite İlker Ayrık. It was released on 20 December 2013.

Filmography

References

External links 

Turkish television actresses
Turkish film actresses
1985 births
Actresses from Istanbul
Turkish people of Georgian descent
Living people
Cağaloğlu Anadolu Lisesi alumni